Ariceștii may refer to one of two communes in Prahova County, Romania:

Ariceștii Rahtivani
Ariceștii Zeletin